The 1975–76 FIBA Women's European Champions Cup was the 18th edition of FIBA Europe's competition for women's basketball national champion clubs, running from October 1975 to March 1976. The Soviet Union didn't take part in the competition, ending Daugava Riga's record 12-year winning streak, and Sparta Prague defeated Clermont UC in the last final played as a two-legged tie to become the first Czechoslovak team to win the trophy.

Preliminary round

First round

Group stage

Group A

Group B

Semifinals

Final

References

Champions Cup
EuroLeague Women seasons